The following lists events that happened during 2012 in South Africa.

Incumbents
President – Jacob Zuma 
Deputy President – Kgalema Motlanthe
Chief Justice – Mogoeng Mogoeng

Cabinet 
The Cabinet, together with the President and the Deputy President, forms part of the Executive.

National Assembly

Provincial Premiers 
 Eastern Cape Province: Noxolo Kiviet 
 Free State Province: Ace Magashule 
 Gauteng Province: Nomvula Mokonyane 
 KwaZulu-Natal Province: Zweli Mkhize 
 Limpopo Province: Cassel Mathale
 Mpumalanga Province: David Mabuza
 North West Province: Thandi Modise 
 Northern Cape Province: Hazel Jenkins 
 Western Cape Province: Helen Zille

Events
May
 22-24 – OpenForum conference is held in Cape Town.

August
 10 – Marikana miners initiate a Wildcat strike.
 13 – Striking miners hack to death two security guards and two policemen and remove body parts from the corpses to make muti that would make them "invincible against police bullets".
 16 – Police open fire on a group of striking Marikana miners, killing 34 and injuring approximately 78.

September
 18 – Eight South African citizens are killed in Kabul, Afghanistan, when a suicide bomber blows herself up.

October
 1 – The South African Government commissions an inquiry into the shooting at Marikana.
 18 – A South African Defence Force soldier attached to the African Union/United Nations peacekeeping forces in Sudan is killed and 3 others injured in an ambush in Northern Darfur.

November
 11 – A runaway fire destroys 76 houses in St Francis Bay.

Births

Deaths

 21 January – Jeffrey Ntuka, South African footballer . (b. 1985)
 2 March – Lawrence Anthony, author. (b. 1950)
 30 April – Sicelo Shiceka, South African politician (b. 1966)
 5 May – Roy Padayachie, Minister of Public Service and Administration of the Republic of South Africa. (b. 1950)
 15 May – John Murray, 11th Duke of Atholl, surveyor (b. 1929)
 27 August – Dr. Neville Alexander, linguist, academic and anti-apartheid campaigner (b. 1936)
 21 October – Alfred Kumalo, photographer. (b. 1930)

Railways

See also
2012 in South African television

References

Further reading
 

History of South Africa